Alaninol is the organic compound with the formula CH3CH(NH2)CH2OH.  A colorless solid, the compound is classified as an amino alcohol.  It can be generated by converting the carboxylic group of alanine to an alcohol with a strong reducing agent such as lithium aluminium hydride.  The compound is chiral, and as is normal for chiral compounds, the physical properties of the racemate differ somewhat from those of the enantiomers. It is a precursor to numerous chiral ligands used in asymmetric catalysis.

References

Amino alcohols